The Order of St. George – a European Order of the House of Habsburg-Lorraine, or simply Order of Saint George, is a dynastic order of chivalry and thus a house order of the House of Habsburg, the former Imperial and Royal House of the Holy Roman Empire, the Habsburg monarchy, the Empire of Austria, the Austro-Hungarian Monarchy, the Kingdom of Hungary, the Crown lands of Bohemia and Croatia and further nations. 

The order combines knightly tradition with the idea of a united Europe in the sense of the political ideas of Archduke Otto von Habsburg. The roots of the order go back a long way, not in the sense of an uninterrupted continuity, but in the continuation of an ideal of Christian chivalry. The history of the Order in Central Europe begins in the Kingdom of Hungary in the 14th century, experienced its heyday as a Habsburg house order at the beginning of modern times, was reinterpreted after the end of the First World War and continued as a dynastic house order of the 21st century on behalf of Archduke Otto and his son Karl von Habsburg.

It is a European and non-partisan order, which supports the transnational idea of Mitteleuropa (Habsburg definition) and increased need for cooperation between the countries of Central and Southeastern Europe. It is committed to Christianity and a united self-confident Europe. It has approximately 600 imperial knights and Commanderies in Austria, Croatia, Czech Republic, Germany, Hungary, Italy, Netherlands, Serbia, Slovenia, Switzerland and the United Kingdom. The order represents the centuries-old Habsburg principle of "live and let live" in relation to ethnic groups, peoples, minorities, religions, cultures and languages. The motto of the order is "Viribus Unitis".

Patron saint 
The patron saint of the order is St. George as a symbol of chivalry.

Principle 
The order claims to engage in charity activities. According to its own information, the St. George Order is a non-profit order that strives to alleviate or combat the "eightfold misery" in the world: sickness, abandonment, homelessness, hunger, lovelessness, guilt, indifference, and disbelief.

History

Early centuries 

The origins of today's Order of St. George, a European order of the House of Habsburg-Lorraine, are seen in medieval chivalric orders, not in the sense of an uninterrupted continuity, but in the continuation of an ideal of Christian chivalry.

The order has traditional roots in the Austrian Order of St. George, which was founded by Emperor Friedrich III. of Habsburg and Pope Paul II in Rome in 1469. The headquarters were the former Benedictine monastery Millstatt, the second headquarters was Wiener Neustadt. Emperor Maximilian of Habsburg was a particular patron of the order. It is believed that the Order of St. George by Emperor Friedrich III was connected to another previous order, the Austrian Dragon Society founded in 1409 in Ödenburg, which in turn was directly connected to the Order of the Dragon by the Hungarian King and Emperor Sigismund.

The sovereignty of the Order of St. George or the St. George Knights Brotherhood, which was also founded by Emperor Maximilian I, has remained with the House of Habsburg-Lorraine. Emperor Maximilian I tried to promote his St. George's associations and use them politically. On 15 November 1494, for example, he made an appeal to all Christian kings and princes, as well as to all Christianity, to join the Brotherhood and to support a Turkish campaign planned by the emperor for the following year, but without finding much interest. He gave the knights who would take part in this campaign the privilege of wearing a crown in their coat of arms and thus created the status of the "crowned knight".

20th century 
In 1923, officers of the Central Powers, the German Empire and Austria-Hungary, which were allied during World War I, founded an association. Their orientation was monarchistic and followed the tradition of the Holy Roman Empire. In 1926, in a reorganization convention in Hanover, the tradition of the former Limburg house order was integrated, especially the reference to the four Luxembourg emperors and their initials in the insignia. In 1927, the statutes were revised to deepen it and the order was given the name “Old Knight Order of St. George called Order of the Four Roman Emperors”, with the balles of Wendland, Lower Saxony, Rhineland-Westphalia, southern Germany and Austria-Hungary. Expression of this renewal of the order in spirit was the adoption of St. George in the order. The position of a grand master was left vacant, the administration of the order was held by an order governor.

In 1935, due to the political situation in the German Reich, the seat was moved to Salzburg, from whence it stood against National Socialism, for a Central Europe independent of Nazi Germany and for the re-establishment of the House of Habsburg. In 1938, after the annexation of Austria, the order was banned and dissolved by the Nazis for political reasons. Many who campaigned for Habsburg restoration during the Nazi era were killed, taken to a concentration camp, or persecuted by the Gestapo. Maximilian, Duke of Hohenberg, who represented the expelled Otto von Habsburg in many matters, was taken to the Dachau concentration camp by the National Socialists in 1938. Many of these imperial resistance fighters, such as Heinrich Maier, who successfully passed on production sites and plans for V-2 rockets, Tiger tanks and aircraft to the Allies, or Karl Burian who planned to blow up the Gestapo headquarters in Vienna, were badly tortured and executed.

The House of Habsburg was an early supporter of European integration and a vehement opponent of National Socialism and Communism. During communism, former members of the order or other Habsburg supporters were persecuted behind the Iron Curtain. The Communists and Socialists as well as the USSR were strictly anti-Habsburg because they feared opposition in their countries. The Habsburg family played a leading role in the fall of the Iron Curtain.

21st century 
On 18 January 2008, on behalf of Archduke Otto and his son Archduke Karl, the foundation of the European Order of St. George was celebrated in Munich and a first order chapter was elected.

At the convent on 30 April 2011, Archduke Karl von Habsburg confirmed the Order of St. George – A European order of the House of Habsburg-Lorraine as an order of the House of Habsburg. Building on the centuries-old Habsburg motto "Viribus Unitis", the peoples and nations of Central Europe should now take care of their interests together. In the framework of this Order, the historical connections are to be strengthened and expanded, also in order to be able to perform better in United Europe. The Order sees it as its task to recognize and preserve the common cultural, scientific and interpersonal heritage of Central Europe. The model is the tolerant Habsburg approach to the national diversity of the peoples of Central Europe.

The members of the order should also use those Habsburg roots that extend beyond Central Europe, for example to Italy, Switzerland, Spain, France, Great Britain, Germany, the Benelux countries and the Orient. Accordingly, the Order has a close relationship with the Austrian Pilgrims Hospice to the Holy Family in Jerusalem, which was donated by Emperor Franz Joseph I for all people of the Habsburg Monarchy.

Vinzenz Stimpfl-Abele, procurator of the Order, goes back to Bernhard von Clairvaux to consider the importance of the Order and the knights in the 21st century. On the one hand in their self-image as an elitist Christian protective force and on the other hand in their endeavor to fulfill social tasks. According to Stimpfl-Abele, this also means for Ritter today to confess Christian values with an open visor, to be aware of history and its teachings, to maintain traditions and, in particular, to actively bring about change in order to combat misery. By his definition, values today are the sword and assertiveness the shield of a modern knight.

Regarding the necessary moral attitude of a St. George knight today, Bishop Klaus Küng said during an investiture in Budapest: "When it comes to values that are of great importance to human development, it is necessary to stand up for them courageously. What are these values? - Ultimately, it's Christian values." But that also means that the order in Habsburg tradition is particularly dedicated to the peaceful balance between religions and the intercultural encounter between Christianity, Judaism and Islam.

In addition to local meetings, the order has major events such as in Vienna, Budapest, Prague, Zagreb, Ljubljana, Trieste, Milan, London, Frankfurt, Salzburg, and Tyrol. The band "K.u.k. Regimentskapelle IR4" plays at many events of the order.

According to the order's homepage, members are often well-known personalities, but also people such as Ulrich W. Lipp, the long-standing Habsburg imperial advisor, herald and master of ceremonies, Otto von Habsburg's political assistant Eva Demmerle or Alexander Pachta-Reyhofen, the Chancellor of the Order of the Golden Fleece.

The admission was and is a special privilege and a great honor. Admission to the order of imperial knights takes place by accolade.

Notable members

Knights 
Source

 Jan Peter Balkenende
 Erhard Busek
 Ján Čarnogurský
 Luis Durnwalder
 Werner Fasslabend
 Massimiliano Fedriga
 Norbert Hofer
 Gjorge Ivanov
 Karlheinz Kopf
 David Mackintosh
 Roberto Maroni
 Siegfried Nagl
 Harald Ofner
 Rosen Plevneliev
 Erwin Pröll
 Josef Pühringer
 Lord Robertson of Port Ellen
 Ľubomír Roman
 Luigi Roth
 Franz Schausberger
 Peter Schmitz
 Zsolt Semjén
 Herwig van Staa
 Lord Steel of Aikwood
 Thomas Stelzer
 Bojan Šober
 Ludvik Toplak
 Lord Watson of Richmond

Dames 
Source
 Archduchess Eilika
 Beatrix Karl
 Mária Schmidt
 Ursula Stenzel
 Verica Trstenjak

See also
 Accolade
 Imperial Knight
 Military Order of Maria Theresa
 Military order (religious society)
 Nobility
 Order of chivalry
 Order of Franz Joseph
 Order of Leopold
 Order of the Iron Crown
 Ritter

References

External links 
History of the former National Order and the current Chartered Dynastic Order
Official website
Facebook Page

Austrian Empire
Austrian culture
Central Europe
Central European culture
Dynastic orders
German resistance to Nazism
History of Central Europe
Holy Roman Empire
House of Habsburg
House of Habsburg-Lorraine
Knights
 8
Orders of chivalry
Orders of chivalry of Austria